Raymond Calais Jr. (born April 2, 1998) is an American football running back for the DC Defenders of the XFL. He played college football at Louisiana, and was drafted by the Tampa Bay Buccaneers in the seventh round of the 2020 NFL Draft.

High school career
In his last year of high school at Cecilia High School, he was named the Louisiana Boys Track & Field Athlete of the Year after winning state in four different categories at the 4A level: individually in the 100 meter and 200 meter races, and as part of a team in the 4x100 and 4x200 relays. He was rated as a two star football recruit before committing to Louisiana-Lafayette, choosing the Ragin' Cajuns over Louisiana-Monroe.

College career
During his senior season at Louisiana, Calais rushed for 886 yards on 117 attempts, recording six touchdowns. Calais also had 541 kick return yards for a Sun Belt Conference-best 28.5 yards per attempt. He earned First-team All-Sun Belt Conference honors as a return specialist and was Third-team as a running back. In his college career, he rushed for a total of 1,845 yards and 15 touchdowns and made 15 receptions for 145 yards and a touchdown. After his senior season, Calais participated in the NFLPA Collegiate Bowl.

Professional career

Tampa Bay Buccaneers
Calais was selected by the Tampa Bay Buccaneers with the 245th pick in the seventh round of the 2020 NFL Draft. He was placed on the reserve/COVID-19 list by the team on July 31, 2020, and was activated six days later. He was waived by the Buccaneers on September 5, 2020, and was signed to the practice squad the following day.

Los Angeles Rams
On September 9, 2020, Calais was signed by the Los Angeles Rams off the Buccaneers' practice squad. He was placed on injured reserve on January 8, 2021. He was waived/injured on August 23, 2021, and placed on injured reserve. Calais won Super Bowl LVI when the Rams defeated the Cincinnati Bengals.

Calais was waived on August 20, 2022.

DC Defenders
Calais signed with the DC Defenders of the XFL on March 14, 2023.

References

External links
Louisiana Ragin' Cajuns bio

1998 births
Living people
People from Breaux Bridge, Louisiana
Players of American football from Louisiana
American football running backs
Louisiana Ragin' Cajuns football players
Tampa Bay Buccaneers players
Los Angeles Rams players
DC Defenders players